N of tha World is the seventh studio album by Natas. Released in 2006, it was the group's first album released by Reel Life Productions since 1999's WicketWorldWide.COM, although there were claims that there was no newly recorded material by Natas, which broke up in 2002. Five songs on the album were newly recorded after Esham departed from Psychopathic Records in October 2005; the rest of the album consists of material recorded by Esham and T-N-T for a prospective Esham album, to be titled Club Evil, that never came out. Despite the album being attributed to Natas, the only track by the group is N of tha World. The other four new songs were "World's Apart", "On My Own", "Trouble & Pain" and "Niggaz Always Talkin' Alot of Shit".

Music and lyrics
N of tha World features live instrumentation and loops which derive from blues, funk and hard rock. "See You In Hell" is built around a sample of the Muddy Waters song "Tom Cat", from his 1968 psychedelic concept album Electric Mud. "Why You Gotta Lie" samples the drum break from Aerosmith and Run-DMC's "Walk This Way" and the chord progression of Metallica's "Enter Sandman".

The album's lyrics focus on topics ranging from women and violence to spirituality. Natas expresses self-reliance and allegiance to God. However, Esham refers to himself once again as "The Unholy" on the album in material recorded prior to signing with Psychopathic, a moniker he had not used since the song "Enjoy Life" from the 2003 Bedlam album "Bedlamitez Rize".

Reception
About.com reviewed the album favorably, writing "Great, great stuff that I personally will drop on the many I meet daily that are starved for proper hip-hop."

Track listing

Personnel 
 Esham the Unholy a.k.a. Black Hitler — rapping
 T-N-T a.k.a. The Dynamite Kid — rapping
 Mastamind a.k.a. Mr. Hellraiser — rapping

Musicians 
 Mike P. — lead guitar
 Randy (The Leer Jet Engineer Fixin') Lynch — lead guitar on "Pancakes & Syrup" and "On My Own"
 The Brian Schram Band — instrumentation ("Worlds Apart")

Production 
 Esham — producer, executive producer
 Young Kyle for Blackstone — A&R exec
 Mike P. — additional technical support
 Eric Saunders — cover art
 Michael Broom — drawings

References 

2006 albums
Albums produced by Esham
Natas (group) albums
Reel Life Productions albums
Warlock Records albums